Alpha Psi Rho, also known as APsiRho, is an Asian and Pacific Islander-interest fraternity founded at San Diego State University in 2000. It has expanded to include four chapters located in California and Nevada.

History 
The student founders of Alpha Psi Rho grew up in an era when Asian and Pacific Islander Americans were struggling to find their identities in the United States. Although the founders became involved in cultural organizations at San Diego State University, they wanted to create a group people who have similar interests, lived a similar lifestyle, and hungered to make greater impacts in the community.

The Ten Founding Fathers established Alpha Psi Rho on March 1, 2000, as a fraternity for Asian and Pacific Islander students. The fraternity was based on four pillars: Brotherhood, Academics, Prosperity, and Strength. Although established as a Asian or Filipino fraternity, it welcomes all races.

The founding fathers of Alpha Psi Rho are:
Benjamin Abiva
Reuel Anday
Jay Balanay
Kenny Fong
Anthony Gambol
James Kuniyoshi
Ryan Lucina
Kenny Ortega
Jeremy Quirante
Jason Valoroso
The fraternity's Beta chapter was established by five students at California State University, Northridge in 2003. This followed by the Gamma chapter at California State University San Marcos. Gamma chapter started as a special interest group called BAPS on August 26, 2006, and was chartered as Alpha Psi Rho on February 22, 2012. The Delta chapter at the University of Nevada, Las Vegas was chartered on April 2, 2011. Alpha Psi Rho members are referred to as "brhothers". 

The Gamma chapter won the university's Community Development and Lifelong Membership award for 2014-2015. The fraternity hosts events such as a cultural festival at California State University, San Marcus for Asian Pacific American Heritage Month and participated in the annual Festival of Communities at UNLV. Members also volunteer with charities that work with Asian-Pacific Islander youth. 

The fraternity's national headquarters is located in San Diego, California. Its publication is the Alpha Psi Rho Monthly Newsletter.

Chapters 
Active chapters are in bold, and inactive groups are in italics. There is currently 4 active chapters and 1 inactive colony.

Notes

See also

 Cultural interest fraternities and sororities

References

Fraternities and sororities in the United States
Pacific Islands American culture in California
California State University auxiliary organizations
San Diego State University
2000 establishments in California
Student organizations established in 2000
Asian-American culture